Doğramaci's vole (Microtus dogramacii) is a species of rodent in the family Cricetidae. It is found only in central Turkey, and is similar to the social vole, although different in terms of cranial proportions and karyotype.

References

D.E. Wilson & D.M. Reeder, 2005: Mammal Species of the World: A Taxonomic and Geographic Reference. Third Edition. The Johns Hopkins University Press, Baltimore.

Dogramaci's
Mammals described in 1999
Endemic fauna of Turkey